was a town located in Kōka District, Shiga Prefecture, Japan. There was Ishibe-juku in Edo period.

As of 2003, the town had an estimated population of 12,418 and a density of 931.58 persons per km2. The total area was 13.33 km2

On October 1, 2004, Ishibe, along with the town of Kōsei (also from Kōka District), was merged to create the city of Konan. An NSK Bearings plant is located here.

Dissolved municipalities of Shiga Prefecture